Stafford Road railway station served the city of Wolverhampton, England from 1850 to 1852 on the Wolverhampton-Shrewsbury line.

The station opened in October 1850 by the Shrewsbury and Birmingham Railway. The station was situated to the west of Stafford Road at the present site of Stafford Road Junction. The station was served by six trains on Mondays to Saturdays with two on Sundays in both directions between Wolverhampton Temporary and Shrewsbury.  It was a short distance from Wolverhampton station and so Stafford Road proved to be unprofitable and closed completely in June or July 1852.

There is no evidence of the station's existence today.

References

External links 

Disused railway stations in Staffordshire
Railway stations in Great Britain opened in 1850
Railway stations in Great Britain closed in 1852
1850 establishments in England
Disused railway stations in Wolverhampton